The Saint Kitts Democratic Party was a political party in Saint Kitts-Nevis-Anguilla.

History
The party was established in 1949, and was a pro-employer alternative to the Workers League. In the 1957 general elections it received 9.2% of the vote, but failed to win a seat. They did not contest any further elections.

References

Defunct political parties in Saint Kitts and Nevis
Political parties established in 1949
1949 establishments in Saint Kitts-Nevis-Anguilla